Sail numbers for the 'new generation' International America's Cup Class (IACC) yachts are issued on a sequential numerical basis.  The number is then prefixed by the abbreviation for the country.  If a yacht is subsequently sold to a team in a different country then the number remains unchanged but the prefix changes to reflect the new country of ownership.

Race reports tend to use team names rather than the boat names and in most cases a boat does not have a unique name.  So it has become difficult to know which actual boat raced in a particular event without reference to the results list published by the race organisers.

The following list is part of ongoing research to identify particular boats and key points in their history.

List 
Abbreviations: AC – America's Cup, LVC – Louis Vuitton Cup, R-R –  Round-Robin.

See also 
 International America's Cup Class

References

International America's Cup Class
Lists of individual sailing yachts